Mycothiol synthase (MshD) is an enzyme with systematic name acetyl-CoA:desacetylmycothiol O-acetyltransferase. This enzyme catalyses the following chemical reaction

 desacetylmycothiol + acetyl-CoA  CoA + mycothiol

This enzyme catalyses the last step in the biosynthesis of mycothiol

References

External links 
 

EC 2.3.1